The 1882 Lafayette football team was an American football team that represented Lafayette College as an independent during the 1882 college football season. The team was the first to play intercollegiate football for Lafayette, compiling an 0–2 record. Henry Craven was the team captain, and W. R. Wilson was the manager.

In the first game of the season, 1882 Rutgers Queensmen football teamscored eight touchdowns and no goals; Lafayette scored three touchdowns and no goals.

In the second game, Lafayette lost to Penn.

Schedule

References

Lafayette
Lafayette Leopards football seasons
College football winless seasons
Lafayette football